Pedro Alberto Cano Arenas (18 June 1969 – 20 July 2002), known as Pedro Alberto, was a Spanish footballer who played as a central defender.

Club career
Born in Bilbao, Biscay, Pedro Alberto joined Real Oviedo in 1991 from lowly CF Palencia. He made his La Liga debut on 29 February of the following year by starting in a 0–2 home loss against FC Barcelona, but was only a backup or reserve team player for the vast majority of his spell in Asturias, his best output consisting of 33 matches and one goal in the 1995–96 season to help the club finish 14th in the top flight, thus avoiding relegation.

After leaving in summer 1996, Pedro Alberto played a further four years at the professional level, representing Deportivo Alavés and CD Toledo in Segunda División. He also competed with the latter in Segunda División B.

Death
On 20 July 2002, just three days into preseason with his new team, Novelda CF in the third level, Pedro Alberto had just finished a short sprint and was preparing to stretch, when he fell to the ground and lost consciousness. His death was attributed to a cerebral hemorrhage, and the 33-year-old left behind a seven-month pregnant wife.

Honours
Palencia
Tercera División: 1989–90

Alavés
Segunda División: 1997–98

References

External links

1969 births
2002 deaths
Spanish footballers
Footballers from Bilbao
Association football defenders
La Liga players
Segunda División players
Segunda División B players
Tercera División players
CF Palencia footballers
Real Oviedo Vetusta players
Real Oviedo players
Deportivo Alavés players
CD Toledo players
Novelda CF players
Sport deaths in Spain
Association football players who died while playing